Valiant Lady is a cruise ship operated by Virgin Voyages. After she was ordered in October 2016 with Italian shipbuilder Fincantieri, her coin ceremony was held in February 2019 and she was floated out in May 2020 from the shipyard in Sestri Ponente. She was delivered to Virgin in July 2021 as the fleet's second vessel and sailed her maiden voyage in March 2022 from Portsmouth.

Construction and career

Planning and construction 
On 4 December 2014, Virgin Group founder Richard Branson announced that Virgin Group was forming Virgin Cruises, together with the backing of Bain Capital, and revealed plans to build two new cruise ships. On 23 June 2015, Virgin Cruises announced that it signed a letter of intent with Italian shipbuilder Fincantieri for three cruise ships that could each accommodate approximately 2,800 guests and 1,150 crew for seven-day Caribbean voyages. The three-ship order reportedly cost US$2.55 billion, with the second ship scheduled to begin operating in 2021. The order's contract for the ships was formally signed on 18 October 2016, the same day Virgin Cruises rebranded as Virgin Voyages.

On 20 July 2018, Virgin inaugurated the construction for its second ship with the ship's steel-cutting ceremony at Fincantieri's shipyard in Sestri Ponente. The ship's coin ceremony was performed on 8 February 2019. On 19 November 2019, Virgin revealed the name of its second ship as Valiant Lady. During the COVID-19 pandemic, construction delays arose after Fincantieri's operations were suspended. Originally expected to be floated out in March 2020, Valiant Lady was floated out from her dry dock two months behind schedule, on 20 May 2020, and was moved to a new berth to complete her outfitting work. The ship was delivered on 1 July 2021.

Operational career 
Valiant Lady entered service on 18 March 2022, sailing a three night cruise from Portsmouth, England to Zeebrugge, Belgium. She continued sailing from Portsmouth with itineraries visiting Belgium, Spain, Portugal and the Canary Islands before repositioning to the Mediterranean in summer 2022. From May 2022, she sailed from Barcelona to destinations in Italy, Spain, Gibraltar and France. She then repositioned to Miami, Florida in October 2022 to operate cruises to the Caribbean over the winter, before a scheduled return to the Mediterranean in summer 2023.

References 

Cruise ships
Ships built by Fincantieri
2020 ships